David Fuseini Abdulai (c. 1951 – 2 October 2016), also called Dr. Choggu or Dr. Gurugu was a philanthropist, physician and founder of the Shekinnah clinic in Tamale, Ghana. He was the fifth recipient of the Martin Luther King Jr Award, conferred on him by the US Embassy in Ghana in 2012. His father was called Abdul Kaleem Yidantogma. The mother of Dr. Choggu was called AmishetuYahaya, a semi beggar.

References

1950s births
2016 deaths
Ghanaian philanthropists
Dagomba people
People from Tamale, Ghana
20th-century philanthropists